Nicole Blonsky (born November 9, 1988) is an American actress, singer, dancer, and internet personality. She is known for playing Tracy Turnblad in the film Hairspray (2007), for which she won two Critics' Choice Awards and received nominations for a Golden Globe Award and a Screen Actors Guild Award. 

Blonsky has starred as Willamena Rader in the ABC Family series Huge (2010), for which she received a Teen Choice Award nomination, had a recurring role as Margot on the series Smash (2013), and had roles in the films Geography Club (2013) as Therese and The Last Movie Star (2017) as Faith. She is a licensed cosmetologist.

Early life
Blonsky was born and raised in Great Neck, New York. She and her brother Joey are the children of Karen, a school aide, and Carl Blonsky, a municipal worker for the village water pollution control district. Her father is Jewish, and her mother is Roman Catholic. 

Blonsky attended Great Neck North Middle School and attended John L. Miller Great Neck North High School, and switched to Village School after a year at the latter. She additionally attended the after-school theatre program at William A. Shine Great Neck South High School daily, where she participated in productions of Les Misérables, Sweeney Todd, Kiss Me, Kate, and the title role of the opera Carmen.

Career

Blonsky made her screen debut as Tracy Turnblad in the musical feature film Hairspray, which is an adaptation of the musical of the same name. She auditioned for the role as a high-school student with no professional acting or singing background at the time, and beat out eleven-hundred candidates. The film was released to commercial and critical success, and became Blonsky's breakthrough role. She received praise for her performance, with Roger Ebert of The Chicago Sun-Times writing "Without somebody like Nikki Blonsky at the heart of the movie, it might fall flat, but everybody works at her level of happiness..." She received several awards and nominations, including winning two Critic's Choice Awards for Best Actress and Best Acting Ensemble, and being nominated for the Golden Globe Award for Best Actress and the Screen Actors Guild Award for Outstanding Performance by a Cast in a Motion Picture.

On June 22, 2008, she sang The Star-Spangled Banner in the pre-race ceremony at the 2008 Toyota/Save Mart 350 at Infineon Raceway. Blonsky also co-starred in the MTV mystery series Valemont in 2009. In 2010, Blonsky co-starred with Raven Goodwin in the short lived ABC Family series Huge, which premiered in June 2010, and ran for one season. Entertainment Weekly described her as the show's "great asset" and praised her for having "the delicate skill to make Will’s anger take the forms of both sincerity and a funny sarcasm." For Huge, she received a nomination for a Teen Choice Award. 

In 2011, Blonsky earned a cosmetology license, and began working part-time as a hairstylist and make-up artist in her hometown of Great Neck, New York, between acting auditions. In 2013, Blonsky appeared in two episodes of the NBC Broadway drama series Smash. Later that year, she appeared in the film adaptation of the book Geography Club. The film received mixed reviews, however she and the cast were nominated for an award at the ShoWest Convention in 2014. 

Blonsky appeared Off-Broadway in the play Stuffed by Lisa Lampanelli at the Westside Theatre in October 2017 to November 2017. In 2020, Blonsky launched her video blogging series on her Instagram account, in which she chats with other celebrities.

Personal life
In July 2008, Blonsky and her parents were involved in a violent confrontation with the family of Bianca Golden, a former contestant on America's Next Top Model, at the Providenciales International Airport in Turks and Caicos. Golden, Blonsky, and Blonsky's father were all charged with assault. That December, the charges against Blonsky and Golden were dropped.

In June 2020, Blonsky came out as a lesbian in a video posted to the social media site TikTok set to the song "I'm Coming Out" by Diana Ross. In August 2020, Blonsky confirmed that she currently resides on Long Island. In 2022, Blonsky announced her engagement to her partner Hailey Jo Jenson.

Filmography

Film

Television

Awards and nominations

References

External links

"17 Year-Old Nikki Blonsky Cast as Hairspray Film's Tracy", BroadwayWorld.com, June 8, 2006
"Breaking News: Unknown Lands Hairspray Lead" , Cinematical.com, June 8, 2006
"A 'Hairspray' dream come true", MSNBC/Access Hollywood, June 15, 2006

1988 births
Actresses from New York (state)
American child actresses
American child singers
American film actresses
American television actresses
American women bloggers
American bloggers
LGBT people from New York (state)
American LGBT singers
Lesbian dancers
Lesbian singers
Living people
People from Great Neck, New York
American female dancers
American dancers
21st-century American actresses
21st-century American women singers
21st-century American singers
Great Neck North High School alumni
Dancers from New York (state)
American people of Jewish descent
Women video bloggers
American lesbian actresses
American lesbian musicians
Lesbian Jews